Axel Oberwelland (born 1 August 1966) is a German billionaire heir and businessman, the owner of the confectionery manufacturer August Storck, founded by his eponymous great-grandfather in 1903. The company is best known for its brands Werther's Original, Riesen and Toffifee.

Early life
Axel Oberwelland was born on 1 August 1966 in Bielefeld, the son of Klaus Oberwelland.

He went to high school in Bielefeld, followed by a boarding school near St. Moritz, Switzerland, and then studied business at the University of St. Gallen, Switzerland.

Career
He has led the company since his father Klaus Oberwelland retired in 2003, to coincide with the company's centenary.

In April 2018, his net worth was estimated at $3.9 billion.

Personal life
He is married to Bergit Oberwelland, with four children, and lives in Berlin, Germany.

References

1966 births
German billionaires
Living people
University of St. Gallen alumni
Businesspeople from Bielefeld